Crimora coneja, common name the rabbit dorid, is a species of sea slug, a nudibranch, a shell-less marine gastropod mollusc in the family Polyceridae.

Distribution 
This species was described from California. It is reported from Point Loma, San Diego, California to Cape Arago, Oregon.

References

 Turgeon, D.; Quinn, J.F.; Bogan, A.E.; Coan, E.V.; Hochberg, F.G.; Lyons, W.G.; Mikkelsen, P.M.; Neves, R.J.; Roper, C.F.E.; Rosenberg, G.; Roth, B.; Scheltema, A.; Thompson, F.G.; Vecchione, M.; Williams, J.D. (1998). Common and scientific names of aquatic invertebrates from the United States and Canada: mollusks. 2nd ed. American Fisheries Society Special Publication, 26. American Fisheries Society: Bethesda, MD (USA). . IX, 526 + cd-rom pp.

Polyceridae
Gastropods described in 1961
Taxa named by Ernst Marcus (zoologist)